Gage Street is a street in Central, Hong Kong.  It is on the lower hill and between the junction with Cochrane Street and Lyndhurst Terrace, Graham Street and Aberdeen Street.  The street is mainly a market.

It is named after William Hall Gage.

The 2013 novel Gage Street Courtesan by Christopher New depicts the European courtesans who lived in that street in the 19th century.

The 2009 film Bodyguards and Assassins begins with the assassination of Chinese revolutionary Yeung Ku-wan on Gage Street. The site of the assassination, 52 Gage Street, is stop 7 on the Dr Sun Yat Sen Historical Trail

See also

 List of streets and roads in Hong Kong

References

External links
Google Maps of Gage Street

Central, Hong Kong
Street markets in Hong Kong
Roads on Hong Kong Island